Domitila is a 1996 Nigerian film about four prostitutes produced by Zikoko in 1996.

Cast 
Ann Njemanze as Domitilla
Sandra Achums as Judith
Ada Ameh as Anita
Kate Henshaw as Jenny
Charles Okafor as John
Enebeli Elebuwa as Dr Lawson
Maureen Ihua as Mrs Lawson

See also 
Ada Ameh
Anne Njemanze
The Sessions (2020 film)

References 

1996 films
Nigerian drama films

English-language Nigerian films